The following is a list of Teen Choice Award winners and nominees for Choice Music - Male Hottie. Justin Timberlake is most awarded with 3 award wins. Justin Bieber, Justin Timberlake and Zac Efron share being nominated the most with 6 nominations each.

Winners and nominees

1999

2000s

2010s

References

Male Hottie